Baerami is a locality in the Muswellbrook Shire in the Upper Hunter region of New South Wales, Australia.

The Bylong Valley Way crosses the Baerami Creek via Kirks Bridge at Baerami. Downstream of the bridge, the creek meets its confluence with the Goulburn River.

The name of Baerami is associated with a deposit of oil shale, which was reputedly the largest in New South Wales and around twice the size of that at Glen Davis. However, the site where mining occurred on lies Baerami Creek, approximately 25 km south of the road junction near the crossing of Baerami Creek at Baerami, in the adjacent locality of Baerami Creek. 

The Sandy Hollow-Gulgong goods railway line passes through the locality.

Points of interest include Baerami Community Hall, James Estate, Dingo Gully, and the old Baerami Catholic Church.

See also
 Bylong
 Sandy Hollow
 Baerami Creek
 Denman

References

Suburbs of Muswellbrook Shire